Gruppo d'investigazione sulla criminalità organizzata (Organized Crime Investigation Group) also knew with the acronym GICO,  is a specialized department of the Italian Guardia di Finanza, a Special Police force that combats international drugs trafficking, smuggling, money laundering, terrorist financing, financial crimes and illegal immigration. It also performs customs control and border protection missions, anti-Mafia operations, maintains public order and safety, and contributes to the political and military defense of Italy.

Guardia di Finanza